Sajjad Hashemi Ahangari (born 22 August 1991 in Tabriz) is an Iranian sprint athlete who specialises in the 400 metres. He is a former Iranian record holder in the 400 m and 4×400 m relay.

He was a semi-finalist in the event at the 2007 World Youth Championships in Athletics and came fifth at the 2008 Asian Junior Athletics Championships the following year. He returned for the 2010 Asian Junior Athletics Championships and won the 400 m, as well as taking a relay bronze medal and setting a 200 metres national record of 21.09 seconds for fourth place. At the West Asian Championships in Aleppo, Hashemi ran a national junior record of 46.57 seconds to win the 400 m, then (with a team including Reza Bouazar, Sajjad Moradi and Edward Mangasar) he broke the Iranian record for 4×400 metres relay with a time of 3:07.87 minutes.

He was chosen for the 400 m and relay team at the 2010 Asian Games, but did not get past the first round in either event. He established himself in the senior ranks in 2011 by taking the 200 m and 400 m Iranian titles. He came fourth in the 400 m at the 2011 Asian Athletics Championships, just behind Yuzo Kanemaru, and anchored the Iranian 4×400 m relay team to the bronze medal. The 2011 Military World Games in July saw Hashemi break the national record in the 400 m with a run of 45.81 seconds, as he defeated Kenya's Mark Mutai to take the gold medal.

Hashemi ran the 400 m for Iran at the 2012 Summer Olympics.

In 2016, Hashemi was part of the Iranian team that won the silver medal in the men's 4 x 400 m at the Asian Indoor Athletics Champions.  In 2018, the team, also including Hashemi, won bronze.

References

External links

Living people
1991 births
Sportspeople from Tabriz
Iranian male sprinters
Olympic athletes of Iran
Athletes (track and field) at the 2012 Summer Olympics
Athletes (track and field) at the 2010 Asian Games
Athletes (track and field) at the 2014 Asian Games
Asian Games competitors for Iran
21st-century Iranian people